The tomb of Servilia is an Ancient Roman tomb located in Carmona, Spain.

See also
 History of Carmona, Spain

References

External links

Servilii
Ancient Roman buildings and structures in Spain
Buildings and structures in the Province of Seville